The 2020–21 Damehåndboldligaen (known as Bambusa Kvindeligaen for sponsorship reasons) was the 85th season of Damehåndboldligaen, Denmark's premier handball league. Team Esbjerg were the defending champions, Vendsyssel Håndbold were promoted from the 1. division.

Team information

Head coaches

Regular season

Standings

Results

In the table below the home teams are listed on the left and the away teams along the top.

Championship playoffs

Group 1

Group 2

Season statistics

Top goalscorers

Regular season

Overall

Top goalkeepers

Top assists

All-Star Team

Monthly awards

Number of teams by regions

References

External links
 Danish Handball Federaration 

Handboldligaen
Handboldligaen
Damehåndboldligaen